Juraj Bakoš (born September 3, 1960) is a former Slovak professional ice hockey player who played in the Czechoslovak First Ice Hockey League and currently GM of HC Slovan Bratislava. Bakoš was drafted in the twelfth round of the 1984 NHL Entry Draft by the Philadelphia Flyers, but he never played professionally in North America. He spent his entire playing career in Czechoslovakia, playing nine seasons with HC Košice and two seasons with HK Dukla Trenčín. Bakoš served as HC Košice's general manager from 2004 to 2017.

Career statistics

References

External links

1960 births
Living people
HC Košice players
HK Dukla Trenčín players
Philadelphia Flyers draft picks
Czechoslovak ice hockey defencemen
Slovak ice hockey defencemen
Ice hockey people from Bratislava